Managua Fútbol Club is a professional football club based in Managua, Nicaragua which currently plays in the Nicaraguan Premier Division.

History
The team was promoted to the Primera División for the first time in their history in 2009–10 after beating Deportivo América in a two-legged Segunda División championship final.

They made an immediate impact on the top flight, qualifying for the semi-finals in their first season (Apertura 2010). Since then, they have been a regular playoff participant and even reached the finals of the 2017 Apertura, losing on away goals to Walter Ferretti.

In 2018, the club had its most successful period in its history under the guidance of Nicaraguan Emilio Aburto. The club were able to win their first championship (the Apertura 2018) in club history. Managua won 1–0 over two legged series against powerful club Real Esteli F.C.; Lucas dos Santos was the lone goal-scorer for Managua and he was the league-leading goalscorer that season.

Achievements
 Primera División de Nicaragua and predecessors
 Champions (1) : Apertura 2018
 Runners-up (3): Apertura 2017, Apertura 2019, Clausura 2020
 Segunda División de Nicaragua and predecessors
 Champions (1): 2009–10
Copa de Nicaragua: 
 Champions (1): 2019

First Division record (2010–present)
Apertura 2010 – present

Current squad
As of:

Notable players

Notable players

  Lucas dos Santos
  Christian Fernandez
  Clayton José da Cunha (2010–11)
  Edward Murillo
  Mario García
  Víctor Norales (2010–11)
  Gerardo Arce
  Ewing Herrera
  Marvin Joseph
  Brandon Joseph Ramírez (2010–11)
  Justo Lorente
  Norfran Lazo (2011–12)
  Raúl Leguías (2009–10)
  Ivan Méndez
  William Mendieta
  Mario Morales
  Luis Olivares

One-club men

List of coaches
Managua has had permanent managers since it first appointed TBD as coach in 2007. The longest-serving manager was Emilio Aburto, who managed Managua for three years from Feb 2012 to Jan 2015. Argentinian Nestor Holweger was the first foreign coach in the club and helped the club win its first title, winning the second division in 2009. Emilio Aburto is the most successful manager as he led the club to its first Primera division title in 2018 and first Copa de Nicaragua in 2019.

 Nestor Holweger (August 2009 – August 2010)
 Mario Alfaro (August 2010 – February 2012)
 Emilio Aburto (February 2012 – January 2015)
 Carlos Zambrana (January 2015 – December 2015)
 Flavio Da Silva (December 2015 – June 2016)
 Amleto Bonaccorso (June 2016 – August 2016)
 Jack Galindo (August 2016 – September 2016)
 Luis Fernando Fallas (September 2016 – November 2016)
 Jack Galindo (November 2016 – February 2017)
 Emilio Aburto (Feb 2017 – May 2017)
 Tyron Acevedo (May 2017 – Sept 2017)
 Emilio Aburto (September 2017 – August 2021)
 Juan Cortes (September 2021 - August 2022)
 Emilio Aburto (August 2022 - Present)

Records

Record versus other Clubs
 As of 2020-11-08
The Concacaf opponents below = Official tournament results:
(Plus a sampling of other results)

References

External links
 Managua FC asciende a Primera División – Vive Nicaragua

Managua F.C.
Football clubs in Nicaragua
2006 establishments in Nicaragua
Association football clubs established in 2006